Proacerella is a genus of proturans in the family Acerentomidae.

Species
 Proacerella reducta Bernard, 1975
 Proacerella vasconica Aldaba, 1983

References

Protura